The Rochester Maroons were a minor league baseball team that played in Rochester, New York, from 1886 to 1887. They were members of the Interstate League in 1886 and the International Association in 1887. Their home games were played Culver Field.

The 1886 Maroons were runners-up for the International League pennant, the league's championship, with a season record of 56–39, which placed them five-and-a-half games behind the first-place Utica Pent-Ups.

References

External links 
Statistics from Baseball-Reference
Statistics from Stats Crew

1886 establishments in New York (state)
1887 disestablishments in New York (state)
Baseball teams established in 1886
Baseball teams disestablished in 1887
Defunct baseball teams in New York (state)
Professional baseball teams in New York (state)
Maroons